Thornhill Cemetery and Cardiff Crematorium is a major cemetery and crematorium located in Thornhill, a northern suburb of Cardiff, south Wales. It is located on the A469 road (Thornhill Road).

Cardiff Crematorium was opened in 1953 and occupies a  site as part of the Thornhill Cemetery. The cemetery contains two chapels – Wenallt Chapel and Briwnant Chapel – and the Gardens of Remembrance for the scattering of cremated remains.

Notable burials and cremations
 Sir Tasker Watkins (Lord Justice of Appeal)
 Rhodri Morgan (First Minister of Wales)
 Alison Bielski (poet and writer)
 Mickey Gee (rock and roll guitarist)
 Wilf Wooller (sportsman)
 Jack Brooks (politician)

Notes

External links
 
 
 Map

Cemeteries in Cardiff
1953 establishments in Wales
Crematoria in the United Kingdom
20th-century architecture in the United Kingdom